William Morrison Oliver (October 15, 1792 – July 21, 1863) was an American politician, attorney, and jurist who served as a United States Representative for the state of New York and acting Lieutenant Governor of New York.

Early life and education
Born in Londonderry, Rockingham County, New Hampshire, Oliver received limited schooling. Oliver and his identical twin brother, Andrew, were the sons of Andrew and Elizabeth Ormiston Oliver. He studied law in Springfield, under the direction of Judge Morse in Cherry Valley, Otsego County.

Career
He was admitted to the bar about 1812 and began practice in Penn Yan.

Oliver was First Judge of the Yates County Court from 1823 to 1828, and from 1838 to 1844. He was a member of the New York State Senate (7th D.) from 1827 to 1830, sitting in the 50th, 51st, 52nd and 53rd New York State Legislatures. In 1830, he was elected President pro tempore of the State Senate and was Acting Lieutenant Governor until the end of the year.

Elected as a Democrat to the 27th United States Congress, Oliver was United States Representative holding office from March 4, 1841, to March 3, 1843. Afterwards he became clerk of the New York Supreme Court, and was President of the Yates County Bank from the issuance of its charter until 1857.

Personal life
Oliver married Eleanor Young in 1811. They had three children; Andrew, James, and John Morrison. Eleanor died in 1834 and he remarried to Harriet Maria Seelye. That couple had four children; James Morse, William Seelye, Harriet, and Henry.

Oliver died in Penn Yan, Yates County, New York, on July 21, 1863 (age 70 years, 279 days). He is interred at Lake View Cemetery, Penn Yan, New York.

References

External links

 Political Graveyard

Google Books The New York Civil List compiled by Franklin Benjamin Hough (pages 32 and 366; Weed, Parsons and Co., 1858)

1792 births
1863 deaths
People from Londonderry, New Hampshire
Lieutenant Governors of New York (state)
Democratic Party New York (state) state senators
New York (state) state court judges
People from Penn Yan, New York
American bankers
Democratic Party members of the United States House of Representatives from New York (state)
Burials at Lake View Cemetery (Penn Yan, New York)
19th-century American politicians
19th-century American judges
19th-century American businesspeople